Harjaspal Baweja (born 1956) is an Indian film director based in Mumbai and hails from Ludhiana, Punjab, India. He is married to Indian film producer, Pammi Baweja. Their son, Harman Baweja, made his debut in the film Love Story 2050. They have their production company Baweja Movies.

Filmography

As Assistant Director

As director

As producer

As writer

As music director

References

External links
 

Hindi-language film directors
Film directors from Mumbai
Living people
Scindia School alumni
1956 births
Place of birth missing (living people)
20th-century Indian film directors
21st-century Indian film directors